is a Japanese football player. Who Currently Plays for Omiya Ardija Ventus in the WE League. She played for the Japan national team.

Club career
Ariyoshi was born in Saga on November 1, 1987. In 2008, when she was at Nippon Sport Science University, she debuted in the L.League for TEPCO Mareeze. After graduating, she joined Nippon TV Beleza in 2010. She was selected for the Best Eleven four years in a row, from 2013 to 2016).

National team career
In February 2012, Ariyoshi was selected Japan national team for 2012 Algarve Cup. At this competition, on February 29, she debuted against Norway. In 2014, she played at 2014 Asian Cup and 2014 Asian Games. Japan won the championship at Asian Cup and 2nd place at Asian Games. In 2015, played at 2015 World Cup and Japan won 2nd place. She played 6 matches and scored a goal. She was named candidates for the Golden Ball at the tournament. She was also a member for 2018 Asian Cup and Japan won their second consecutive title. She played 63 games and scored 1 goals for Japan.

National team statistics

References

External links

Japan Football Association

1987 births
Living people
Nippon Sport Science University alumni
Association football people from Saga Prefecture
Japanese women's footballers
Japan women's international footballers
Nadeshiko League players
TEPCO Mareeze players
Nippon TV Tokyo Verdy Beleza players
2015 FIFA Women's World Cup players
Women's association football defenders
Footballers at the 2014 Asian Games
Footballers at the 2018 Asian Games
Asian Games gold medalists for Japan
Asian Games silver medalists for Japan
Asian Games medalists in football
Medalists at the 2014 Asian Games
Medalists at the 2018 Asian Games